Zoltán Szécsi (born 22 December 1977) is a Hungarian former water polo goalkeeper, who played on the gold medal squads at the 2000 Summer Olympics, 2004 Summer Olympics and 2008 Summer Olympics. He is one of ten male athletes who won three Olympic gold medals in water polo.  He made his international debut for the men's national team in 1998.
He currently lives in Eger.

Honours

National
 Olympic Games:  Gold medal - 2000, 2004, 2008
 World Championships:  Gold medal - 2003;  Silver medal - 2005, 2007
 European Championship:  Silver medal - 2006;  Bronze medal - 2001, 2003, 2008, 2012
 FINA World League:  Gold medal - 2003, 2004;  Silver medal - 2007;  Bronze medal - 2002
 FINA World Cup:  Gold medal - 1999;  Silver medal - 2002, 2006
 Universiade: (Silver medal - 1997, 1999)
 Junior World Championships: (Silver medal - 1997)
 Junior European Championship: (Silver medal - 1996)

Club
 Hungarian Championship (OB I): 6x (1996, 1997, 1998, 1999 - with BVSC; 2011, 2013 - with Eger)
 Hungarian Cup (Magyar Kupa): 4x (2000, 2003 - with BVSC; 2007, 2008 - with Eger)

Awards
 Masterly youth athlete: 1997
 Silver Széchenyi-medallion (2000)
 Member of the Hungarian team of year: 2000, 2003, 2004, 2008
 Hungarian Water Polo Player of the Year: 2004
 Honorary Citizen of Budapest (2008)
 Honorary Citizen of Eger (2008)
 Ministerial Certificate of Merit (2012)
 Member of International Swimming Hall of Fame (2015)

Orders
   Officer's Cross of the Order of Merit of the Republic of Hungary (2000)
   Commander's Cross of the Order of Merit of the Republic of Hungary (2004)
   Commander's Cross of the Order of Merit of the Republic of Hungary with the Star (2008)

See also
 Hungary men's Olympic water polo team records and statistics
 List of multiple Olympic gold medalists in one event
 List of Olympic champions in men's water polo
 List of Olympic medalists in water polo (men)
 List of players who have appeared in multiple men's Olympic water polo tournaments
 List of men's Olympic water polo tournament goalkeepers
 List of world champions in men's water polo
 List of World Aquatics Championships medalists in water polo
 List of members of the International Swimming Hall of Fame

References

External links
 
 

1977 births
Living people
Water polo players from Budapest
Hungarian male water polo players
Water polo goalkeepers
Water polo players at the 2000 Summer Olympics
Water polo players at the 2004 Summer Olympics
Water polo players at the 2008 Summer Olympics
Water polo players at the 2012 Summer Olympics
Medalists at the 2000 Summer Olympics
Medalists at the 2004 Summer Olympics
Medalists at the 2008 Summer Olympics
Olympic gold medalists for Hungary in water polo
World Aquatics Championships medalists in water polo
Universiade medalists in water polo
Universiade silver medalists for Hungary
Hungarian water polo coaches
20th-century Hungarian people
21st-century Hungarian people